Plectrophora is a genus of flowering plants from the orchid family, Orchidaceae. It is native to Central and South America.

Species accepted as of June 2014:

Plectrophora alata (Rolfe) Garay - Chiapas, Guatemala, Costa Rica, Panama, Colombia 
Plectrophora calcarhamata Hoehne - Matto Grosso 
Plectrophora cultrifolia (Barb.Rodr.) Cogn. in C.F.P.von Martius - French Guinea, Venezuela, Ecuador, Peru, Brazil 
Plectrophora edwallii Cogn. in C.F.P.von Martius - Goiás
Plectrophora iridifolia (Lodd. ex Lindl.) H.Focke - the Guianas, Venezuela, Brazil 
Plectrophora schmidtii Jenny & Pupulin - Matto Grosso 
Plectrophora suarezii Dodson & M.W.Chase - Ecuador
Plectrophora triquetra (Rolfe) Cogn. in C.F.P.von Martius  - Ecuador, Peru
Plectrophora tucanderana Dodson & R.Vásquez - Bolivia
Plectrophora zarumensis Dodson & P.M.Dodson - Ecuador

See also 
 List of Orchidaceae genera

References 

 Berg Pana, H. 2005. Handbuch der Orchideen-Namen. Dictionary of Orchid Names. Dizionario dei nomi delle orchidee. Ulmer, Stuttgart

External links 

IOSPE orchid photos, Plectrophora alata (Rolfe) Garay 

Oncidiinae genera
Oncidiinae